Kemerburgaz is a village in the Eyüp district of Istanbul Province, Turkey.

Toponymy
Kemerburgaz is a historic settlement located southwest of Belgrad Forest between the aqueducts Kurt Kemeri ("Wolf's Aqueduct") and Uzun Kemer ("Long Aqueduct"). During the Byzantine era ( 330–1453), its name was Pyrgos (for 'tower' or 'bastion'). After the conquest of Istanbul in 1453, it was renamed , the Turkish language translation for bastion.

Demographics
The ethnographic structure of the village remained quite unchanged during the Ottoman era after the conquest (1453–1923). According to the first census conducted after the Turkish War of Independence, the village had 360 Greek-origin and ten Turkish households. The Turkish residents were immigrants from Bulgaria during the Russo-Turkish War (1877–78). During the 1923 population exchange between Greece and Turkey, Turkish people from Thessaloniki were settled in the village replacing the people of Greek origin, who were sent in exchange to Greece, where they founded the settlement of Neos Pyrgos (New Pyrgos) in North Euboea.

Access
İETT city bus lines #48 (Göktürk-Mecidiyeköy, #48A (Göktürk-Kazlıçeşme), #48E (Göktürk-Eminönü), #48K (Kemerburgaz-Ağaçlı Köyü), #48KA (Kemerburgaz-Arnavutköy), #48L (Göktürk-4. Levent Metro), and #48P (Kemerburgaz-Akpınar) serve Kemerburgaz from various locations of Istanbul.

References

Villages in Istanbul Province
Eyüp
Populated coastal places in Turkey